Callionymus umbrithorax, the Philippine darkthroat dragonet, is a species of dragonet native to the Pacific waters of the Philippines where it occurs at a depth of around .

References 

U
Fish described in 1941